Candle tree is a common name for several plants and may refer to:

 Dacryodes excelsa 
 Parmentiera cereifera of the family Bignoniaceae
 Senna alata of the family Fabaceae (Candelabra bush, empress candle plant, candlestick tree, ringworm tree)